The Osceola Depot is a historic railroad station located at 114 Depot Rd. in Osceola, Wisconsin. The station was built in 1916 for the Minneapolis, St. Paul and Sault Ste. Marie Railroad. Later, the line would become a part of the Soo Line Railroad and eventually Canadian National.  Today, the depot serves as a part of the Minnesota Transportation Museum as the starting point for a heritage railway.

Passenger service to Osceola ended on June 25, 1961, when trains 62 and 63 between the Twin Cities and Duluth were discontinued.

The depot was added to the National Register of Historic Places in 2000.

References

Railway stations on the National Register of Historic Places in Wisconsin
Railway stations in the United States opened in 1916
Former Soo Line stations
National Register of Historic Places in Polk County, Wisconsin
Former railway stations in Wisconsin